Visit Baltimore, formerly the Baltimore Area Convention & Visitors Association (BACVA), is a quasi-public organization started in 1980 by then-Baltimore Mayor William Donald Schaefer. The agency is charged with bringing in tourists and conventions into the city of Baltimore, Maryland, but does not manage the actual convention venues, hotels, or museums in the city.

History

In 2004, BACVA launched a totally redesigned website. A major event for BACVA in 2004 occurred in May when it officially opened a totally new Baltimore Visitor Center. This was radically different from the old visitor center, which was inside an antiquated modified construction trailer. The new  Baltimore Visitor Center is located next to the Light Street Pavilion of Harborplace and has a unique design. It cost $4.5 million to construct. In its first year of operation (May 7, 2004 – May 7, 2005), the center attracted nearly 390,000 visitors, which exceeded BACVA's original estimate of 250,000. Visitors to the center in its first year of operation booked 422 hotel rooms, worth $48,296, and bought 14,942 tickets worth about $223,286.

Inside the Baltimore Visitor Center are racks of brochures with information ranging from Baltimore's neighborhoods to major attractions, including the Maryland Science Center, the National Aquarium in Baltimore, Power Plant Live!, and Camden Yards Sports Complex. There is also a 50-seat theater that shows an 11-minute film on Baltimore and Maryland.

In 2005, BACVA made a joint effort with the Baltimore Development Corporation (BDC) to pitch a controversial $305 million, 752-room Hilton Hotel to the Baltimore City Council in an attempt to bring in more conventions to the Baltimore Convention Center. In 2006, BACVA succeeded in its joint effort with the BDC to have a Hilton Hotel built directly adjacent to the Baltimore Convention Center. The hotel officially opened in August 2008 with a direct connection to the Baltimore Convention Center via  elevated skybridge crossing Howard Street.

In 2009, BACVA made a decision at its annual meeting to change its name from the Baltimore Area Convention and Visitors Association to Visit Baltimore to make it easier for the public to recognize Baltimore's tourism agency and that it followed an industry standard at the time of having tourism agencies have a name that reflect their mission.

The 2005–2008 efforts to bring in more conventions by having the Hilton Baltimore built at a cost of $305 million – the most expensive public works project in city history – were basically a failure and the city is still losing convention business and struggling to find more business. Visit Baltimore is now supporting an estimated $900 million proposal floated by the Greater Baltimore Committee and local businessman and the current owner of the Sheraton Inner Harbor hotel in early 2011 that would build a brand-new 18,500-seat arena to replace the 1st Mariner Arena, a brand-new 500-room hotel to replace the Sheraton and demolish and rebuild the east half of the Baltimore Convention Center as an expansion of the newer, 1996 half. The hotel and arena would be funded by private-sector money while the convention center expansion would be funded by public money; it is unknown what the breakdown of costs will be as that will be determined by a second study to be conducted soon that will continue to see if construction of the entire project is feasible and exactly how much the project would cost the city and state potentially and what the next steps will be.

References 
Visitor center exceeds expectations in Year 1. Baltimore Sun May 6, 2005. (Site registration required.)

External links
Visit Baltimore Official Website
Baltimore Visitor Center

Culture of Baltimore
Visitor centers in the United States
Buildings and structures in Baltimore
Tourist attractions in Baltimore
Tourism agencies